FC Istogu, commonly known as Istogu is a football club based in Istog, Kosovo. The club plays in the First Football League of Kosovo, which is the second tier of football in the country.

History and supporters
The club have been playing in the lower divisions of Yugoslavia and now Kosovo for almost all the time since they were founded. KF Istogu don't have any big merits which they have been winning. In the season 2007–08, their best scorer ever, Suad Saliagić was sold to FC Prishtina for an unknown sum, he scored 26 goals in 11 games which is a record in Kosovo. Since the 1960s, the club has always been a "middle club" in the lower divisions.

Their fan club is known as Gjimmat and they were formed in 2000.

Players

Current squad

Personnel

Notes and references

Notes

References

KF Istogu
1947 establishments in Yugoslavia
Association football clubs established in 1947
Football clubs in Yugoslavia
Football clubs in Kosovo